Lilian Mihaylov (born 7 September 1994) is a Bulgarian badminton player. He competed at the 2015 European Games in Baku, Azerbaijan.

Achievements

BWF International Challenge/Series 
Mixed doubles

  BWF International Challenge tournament
  BWF International Series tournament
  BWF Future Series tournament

References

External links 
 

1998 births
Living people
Sportspeople from Stara Zagora
Bulgarian male badminton players
Badminton players at the 2015 European Games
European Games competitors for Bulgaria
21st-century Bulgarian people